Bērnu Klīniskā Universitātes Slimnīca (BKUS) is the only specialised children’s hospital in Riga, and is part of the University hospitals of Latvia. (English:  Children's Clinical University Hospital)

History
The city of Riga established a children's hospital in 1899 with funds provided by a wealthy industrialist, James Armitstead.  This hospital was opened on October 2, 1899 with 116 beds.  The Riga city 1st Children’s Clinic was opened on March 1, 1981 with 406 beds.

In 2022 there is a building programme which will replace the Emergency Medical Assistance and Observation Department.  There will be 32 single wards with individual sanitary facilities, including two intensive therapy wards, two dangerous infection wards, ten infection wards, as well as specially suitable wards for patients with mental disorders, movement disorders, and autistic spectrum disorders. It will also have an Outpatient Health Center with almost 100 doctor reception, examination and procedure rooms.

Services provided
It has about 30,000 inpatients episodes and more than 160,000 outpatient visits a year.  From January to November 2019, 1,155 children were admitted with injuries due to swallowing foreign objects. There were 225 patients in the hospital's palliative care service in December 2019.

In 2019 it set up 7 digital check-in kiosks, with the Check-In, Flow Manager and Calling software to improve the flow of patients around the hospital services.

References

Hospitals in Latvia
Hospitals established in 1899
Children's hospitals
Riga
Hospitals built in the Soviet Union
1899 establishments in the Russian Empire